Artists for Obama was a series of ten limited-edition fine-art prints created and donated by various artists under the direction of U.S. President Barack Obama's 2008 presidential campaign organization, Obama for America. The prints were official campaign products of Obama for America, sold directly by its website, and all proceeds were considered campaign contributions.

2008 prints 

The first Artists for Obama print was released in January 2008, and was created by Shepard Fairey and titled "Change" (in the style of his Obama "Hope" poster). The prints were released as a limited edition of 5,000, of which the first 200 were signed, and retailed for $70.

"Progress," by Scott Hansen, was released on May 23, 2008 as a limited edition of 5,000, and retailed for $70.

"Yes We Can," by illustrator Antar Dayal, was the third print in the series. A limited edition of 5,000 numbered prints, of which the first 200 were signed, the print retailed for $70. The image was created on a Kaolin-coated scratchboard, then coated with black China ink, and finally engraved with fine lines "into the surface, sculpting shadows and highlights."

"Sea to Shining Sea," by Lou Stovall was released in October 2008 as a limited edition of 100 prints. The print retailed for $1,000.

"Hope," by pop artist Robert Indiana, was released in October 2008 as a signed-and-numbered limited edition of 200 prints, which sold out at a price of $2,500 each.

"Possible," by Jonathan Hoefler was released in October 2008 as a limited edition of 5,000. The prints sold for $70.

"Words of Change," by graphic designer Gui Borchert was released in October 2008 in a numbered edition of 5,000, and retailed for $70. The poster contains 20,000 words spoken by Obama during the campaign that are arranged as a portrait of Obama.

"Voz Unida" by Rafael López, released in October 2008, was a limited edition of 5,000, and retailed for $60.

"OBAMA 08" by Lance Wyman, released in October 2008, was a limited edition of 5,000, and retailed for $60.

"Raised Eyebrows/Furrowed Foreheads (Red, White, and Blue)" (2008) is by John Baldessari

The final Artists for Obama print was released just days before the 2008 presidential election, it was a limited edition print of 5,000 by Shepard Fairey, titled "Vote."

Inauguration print 
In January 2009, the Obama inaugural committee released a print produced by Shepard Fairey on behalf of Obama's inauguration. 10,000 numbered prints were produced in total, of which the first 1,000 were signed by Fairey. The signed and numbered prints were sold by the Obama Inaugural Committee for $500, while the unsigned and unnumbered prints were sold for $100.

Resale 
Many of the Artists for Obama prints were bought by investors who bought multiple copies of each poster. After the prints sold out, investors subsequently resold the prints, usually over eBay, at a several hundred percent profit. Immediately after Barack Obama won the 2008 presidential election, prices for the prints skyrocketed. The prices have since decreased and stabilized.

References

External links 
 

Barack Obama 2008 presidential campaign